KSTE (650 AM) is a commercial radio station broadcasting a talk radio format. Licensed to Rancho Cordova, California, the station serves the Sacramento metropolitan area. The station is owned by iHeartMedia and features shows from Westwood One, Radio America, Compass Media Networks, and Premiere Networks, a subsidiary of iHeartMedia.  The studios and offices are in North Sacramento near the Arden Fair Mall.

KSTE transmits with 21,400 watts by day, but because 650 AM is a clear channel frequency reserved for Class A WSM in Nashville, KSTE must reduce power at night to 920 watts to avoid interfering with WSM and other stations on its frequency. It uses a directional antenna at all times with a two-tower array in the daytime and a three-tower array at night. The transmitter is southeast of the city in Vineyard, California.

Programming

Schedule
KSTE is programmed as a "second tier" talk station, secondary to its more dominant sister stations, 1530 KFBK and 93.1 KFBK-FM.  While most of the KFBK schedule is hosted by local personalities, KSTE features nationally syndicated talk shows.  Weekday mornings begin with Armstrong & Getty, a wake-up show based at KSTE and carried on stations around the West Coast and Hawaii.  They are followed by Chad Benson, Sean Hannity, Dave Ramsey, Glenn Beck, Buck Sexton, Joe Pags and Jim Bohannon.

Weekends feature shows on money, health, religion, gardening and cars, as well as some paid brokered programming. The gardening show, "Get Growing with Farmer Fred", hosted by Fred Hoffman, is the longest running show on the station, having debuted when the station signed on the air.  KSTE carries some syndicated shows on weekends including Handel on the Law, The Kim Komando Show, The Tech Guy with Leo Laporte, The Jesus Christ Show and Sunday Night Live with Bill Cunningham, as well as repeats of weekday shows.

Armstrong & Getty

Jack Armstrong and Joe Getty joined KSTE in 1998 and now have one of the highest rated morning radio shows in Northern California. They can also be heard on radio stations in Los Angeles, San Francisco, San Diego, Honolulu and other cities in the West. Armstrong & Getty is the only locally based weekday talk show on KSTE.

News
For a number of years, KSTE aired hourly CNN Radio newscasts from Westwood One, then known as Dial Global. On March 2, 2012, Dial Global announced it would discontinue distributing newscasts from CNN Radio and instead replace it with NBC News Radio. CNN Radio affiliates would be switched to NBC on April 1, 2012. However, KSTE became an affiliate of the CBS Radio Network prior to the switchover. The station carried CBS News at the beginning of most hours.

In 2017, KSTE became an affiliate of a new version of NBC News Radio owned by iHeartMedia (unrelated to the Westwood One/Dial Global version); the station has since rejoined CBS News Radio.  KSTE also airs some programming and news from ABC News Radio.

Sports
KSTE was the former home of Sacramento River Cats Minor League Baseball team, before moving to 1320 KIFM, an ESPN Radio station.

History
The station that today is KSTE was first planned in 1987.  It was assigned the call sign KMCE as it was being prepared for broadcasting.  On April 19, 1990, the station signed on as a Spanish-language outlet, owned by Minority Communications of California, Inc.  The following year, it changed call letters to KRDX.

The station was sold to Fuller-Jeffrey Broadcasting in December 1992 for $1 million.  The new owners changed the call sign to KSTE and the format switched to talk, carrying ABC News Radio for hourly newscasts.

In October 1997, the station changed hands again, this time to Chancellor Broadcasting, a forerunner of iHeartMedia. iHeartMedia kept the talk format in place, making KSTE a rare radio station that, except for its first two years, has remained with the same format for its entire history.

References

External links

STE
Radio stations established in 1990
1990 establishments in California
IHeartMedia radio stations
News and talk radio stations in the United States